The Grand Philharmonic Choir is a large classical music choir based in Kitchener-Waterloo, Ontario.  The choir sings regularly with the Kitchener-Waterloo Symphony at the Centre in the Square. The choir's artistic director is Mark Vuorinen.

History 
The choir was founded in 1883 as the Berlin (Ontario)
Philharmonic and Orchestral Society.  In 1922, after a
hiatus, the choir re-organized itself and changed its name to the
Kitchener Waterloo Philharmonic Choir, since the city of Berlin, Ontario had changed its name to
Kitchener during World War I.  In 2006, the choir changed its name
again, to the Grand Philharmonic Choir.

In 1972, Howard Dyck became the artistic director of the choir,
and led the organization for 38 years; upon his retirement, he was
named Artistic Director Emeritus.  The choir's current conductor is
Mark Vuorinen, who is a doctoral candidate at the
University of Toronto doing research on the music of the Estonian composers
Arvo Pärt and Veljo Tormis.

A wide variety of internationally renowned soloists have sung with the
choir over the years.

Organization 
The Grand Philharmonic Choir organization consists of four choirs: an adult choir of approximately 100 voices, a chamber choir made up of members of the adult choir, a youth choir, and a children's choir.

Programs 
The adult choir often sings three major concerts a year: Handel's
Messiah in December, a concert that includes a major oratorio and
some contemporary repertoire in February,  and a Bach oratorio on
Good Friday, typically the St Matthew Passion,
St John Passion or Mass in B minor.

The chamber choir sings two programs a year, and also often performs
pieces as part of concerts of the adult choir. The youth choir and
children's choirs also produce multiple concerts each year.

All four choirs also join for combined
concerts, and often
sing the Christmas Pops concert with the Kitchener-Waterloo
Symphony.  The choir is also active in its community,
singing at celebrations throughout the year.

See also 

Music of Canada
Canadian classical music
List of bands from Canada

References

External links 
 

Canadian choirs
Musical groups from Kitchener, Ontario
Musical groups established in 1883
Musical groups disestablished in 1922
Musical groups established in 1922
2006 in Canadian music
1883 establishments in Ontario